Coca may refer to any of the four cultivated plants which belong to the family Erythroxylaceae.

Food and drink
 Coca (pastry), a typical Catalan pizza-like dish
 Coca Colla, a Bolivian soft drink that contains extract of the coca leaf
 Coca flour, a dietary supplement made from the ground leaves of the coca plant
 Coca Sek, a short-lived carbonated drink from Colombia that contained coca
 Coca tea, a beverage made from coca leaves
 Coca wine or Mariani wine is an alcoholic wine made from the coca plant
 Coca-Cola, an internationally marketed soft drink
 Coca Cola Corporation, an Atlanta, Georgia company

Music
 Coheed and Cambria, a rock band often called "CoCa" by fans
 Concerto Copenhagen or Concerto Copenhagen, an orchestra based in Copenhagen, Denmark
 Eugen Coca (1893–1954), Moldovan composer and violinist

Places
 Coca de Alba, a town in Salamanca, Spain
 Coca River, a river in Ecuador
 Coca (Slănic), a river in Romania
 Coca, Segovia, a town in Segovia, Spain
 Pizzo Coca, the highest point of Bergamo Alps, Italy
 Coca, a village in Călinești-Oaș Commune, Satu Mare County, Romania
 Coca Antimirești and Coca Niculești, villages in Vintilă Vodă Commune, Buzău County, Romania
 Coca, an alternative name for the city of Puerto Francisco de Orellana, Ecuador
 Coca Cola Airport, in Benton County, Oregon
 Coca Museum, covers the history of the coca plant from the Andean region and related drug cocaine
 Center on Contemporary Art, Seattle, Washington
 Centre of Contemporary Art, Christchurch, New Zealand
  Qoqah, a river in Ethiopia

Other
 Centre of Contemporary Art (CoCA), curated art gallery in New Zealand
 C.O.C.A. or Conference On Crack and Cocaine, British charity
 Coca eradication, a controversial part of the United States' War on Drugs policy
 Coca people, an indigenous people of the Mexican state of Jalisco
 Commission on Osteopathic College Accreditation, abbreviated "COCA"
 Corpus of Contemporary American English

See also
 Cacao (disambiguation)
 Coco (disambiguation)
 Koka (disambiguation)